On the Isle of Wight, Morton is the area of Brading where Morton Marshes and the River Yar form a boundary to the extension of housing estates from  Sandown. 

Morton is distinguished by hawthorn hedges. It is the site of some Roman ruins.

References

Hamlets on the Isle of Wight
Brading